Animal Emergency is an Australian observational documentary series that began airing on the Nine Network on 16 March 2008. It is narrated by Gold Logie winner Georgie Parker.Animal Emergency follows the daily happenings of the Lort-Smith Animal Hospital in Melbourne.

Some media outlets have reported the title of the program to be Animal Hospital; Nine Network has since clarified that this is incorrect, and the show will indeed be titled Animal Emergency.

References

External links
 Official Website
 

Nine Network original programming
Television series about animals
Television shows set in Victoria (Australia)
2008 Australian television series debuts
2008 Australian television series endings
Australian factual television series